Neil Barlow (born February 8, 1988) is an American soccer player who most recently played for Richmond Kickers in the USL Second Division.

Career

Youth and College
Barlow grew up in Herndon, Virginia, and attended Langley High School, where he was named to his district's all-metro, all-district and all-region teams as a junior. Growing up he was a fan of Aston Villa FC citing his favorite players as Andy Townsend and Lee Hendrie keeping posters of both on his bedroom wall. He played college soccer at the University of Virginia, where he was named to the VaSID All-State Second Team as a sophomore. He concluded his collegiate career third on the team in scoring with five goals and six assists in 2009, garnering All-ACC Second Team honors en route to the NCAA Championship, which he personally dedicated to former Aston Villa player Paul Birch who had tragically passed away before the final. He made 68 appearances for the Cavaliers over four seasons, scoring eight goals and providing 16 assists.

During his college years Barlow also played with the Fredericksburg Gunners in the USL Premier Development League.

Professional
Barlow turned professional in 2010 when he signed with the Richmond Kickers of the USL Second Division. He made his professional debut on April 24, 2010 in a league match against the Charlotte Eagles.

Honors

University of Virginia
NCAA Men's Division I Soccer Championship: 2009

References

External links
 Virginia bio

1988 births
Living people
American soccer players
Virginia Cavaliers men's soccer players
Fredericksburg Gunners players
Richmond Kickers players
USL League Two players
USL Second Division players
Soccer players from Virginia
Sportspeople from Fairfax County, Virginia
People from Herndon, Virginia
Association football midfielders
Association football forwards